This article contains a list of the more than 2,200 vascular plant species of Doi Suthep–Pui National Park in Chiang Mai Province, northern Thailand from Maxwell & Elliott (2011:63-154).

Representative species by floral zone
Doi Suthep–Pui National Park displays altitudinal zonation. This section lists some of the characteristic species of each floral zone.

Bamboo/deciduous seasonal forest
Of the 173 tree species which occur in bamboo/deciduous forest, 125 (72%) are deciduous and 31 are common or abundant.

Trees that are commercially valuable include:
Tectona grandis (heavily reduced by logging)
Xylia xylocarpa var. kerrii
Dalbergia cultrata
Pterocarpus macrocarpus
Lagerstroemia cochinchinensis
Chukrasia tabularis
Afzelia xylocarpa

Other characteristic trees are:
Colona flagrocarpa
Schleichera oleosa
Terminalia chebula
Terminalia mucronata
Sterculia pexa
Spondias pinnata
Alstonia scholaris
Protium serratum
Adina trichotoma (especially near streams)

Common understory trees include:
Vitex canescens
Vitex limonifolia
Cassia fistula
Antidesma acidum
Phyllanthus emblica
Stereospermum neuranthum

Characteristic deciduous understory treelets include:
Desmodium laxiflorum
Desmodium pulchellum

Woody climbers (lianas) are often quite large. There are 55 species, of which 65% are deciduous. They include:
Millettia cinerea
Millettia extensa
Combretum latifolium
Congea tomentosa

There are 30 shrub species, of which 63% are deciduous. Shrubs are represented by many species in bamboo/deciduous forest. Some typical examples are:
Helicteres elongata
Helicteres hirsuta
Desmodium gangeticum
Desmodium velutinum
Sericocalyx quadrifarius
Phyllanthus sootepensis
Sauropus hirsutus

Bamboos include:
Bambusa membranacea
Bambusa tulda
Dendrocalamus nudus

Bamboo/deciduous forest supports 38 species of epiphytes, most of which are perennial and 58% of which are evergreen. They mostly belong to 3 groups:
Moraceae (figs, many of which begin their lives as epiphytes)
Orchidaceae (orchids)
Pteridophyta (ferns)

Species particularly characteristic of bamboo/deciduous forest include:
Ficus heterophylla, an evergreen woody climber
Ficus microcarpa, an evergreen tree
Cymbidium aloifolium, a succulent evergreen herb
Platycerium wallichii
Drynaria bonii
Scurrula atropurpurea, an evergreen hemiparasitic epiphyte

Epiliths include 12 species, usually restricted to rocks in streams. They include ferns such as:
Selaginella kurzii
Pteris decrescens

There are also several species of the family Gesneriaceae, include:
Chirita hamosa
Streptocarpus orientalis

The following herbs flower in April before their leaves appear:
gingers:
Globba nuda
Kaempferia rotunda
orchids:
Geodorum siamense
Nervilia aragoana
Nervilia plicata
aroids:
Amorphophallus macrorhizus

Species appearing in May and June, at the start of the rainy season:
Curcuma parviflora
Stemona burkillii
Geodorum recurvum
Habenaria thailandica
Peristylus constrictus

Plants that mature by July and August include ferns, etc. such as:
Selaginella ostenfeldii
Anisocampium cumingianum
Kuniwatsukia cuspidata
Dryopteris cochleata (has bimorphic fronds; a characteristic fern)

The grass most characteristic of the ground flora in bamboo/deciduous forest is:
Oryza meyeriana var. granulata

Other common grasses, which also occur in other habitats and are highly combustible during the hot dry season, are:
Microstegium vagans
Panicum notatum

A total of 316 herb species has been recorded in bamboo/deciduous forest, of which 294 are ground herbs. Of those, 65% are perennial.

Deciduous dipterocarp-oak seasonal forest
In seasonally dry or degraded areas, from the lowlands up to about 800-900 m elevation, deciduous dipterocarp-oak forest replaces bamboo/deciduous forest. It is a secondary, fire climax forest which merges with bamboo/deciduous forest, but is never replaced with mixed evergreen/deciduous forest.

It contains less biodiversity with only 99 tree species, of which 24 are common or abundant.

Dominant tree species of the Dipterocarpaceae include:
Dipterocarpus tuberculatus (especially common along ridge crests)
Dipterocarpus obtusifolius (more common on gentle slopes or in slightly moister areas)
Shorea obtusa
Shorea siamensis

Common Fagaceae species include:
Quercus kerrii
Quercus aliena
Quercus brandisiana
Castanopsis argyrophylla (one of the very few evergreen tree species in deciduous dipterocarp-oak forest)

Other characteristic trees are:
Phoenix loureiroi (a small, fire resistant palm)
Ochna integerrima

Additional common species:
Buchanania cochinchinensis
Buchanania glabra
Craibiodendron stellatum
Eugenia cumini
Dalbergia cultrata
Gluta usitata
Symplocos racemosa
Strychnos nux-vomica

2 tree species have rapid leaf turnover, flushing new leaves at the same time as the old leaves are shed. They include:
Tristaniopsis burmanica var. rufescens
Anneslea fragrans

The following tree is very common at higher elevations (650-800 m), along with the two trees listed above:
Aporosa villosa

Deciduous dipterocarp-oak forest supports only 14 species of woody climbers, but the deciduous species that are easily found are:
Spatholobus parviflorus
Aganosma marginata
Celastrus paniculatus

Shrubs (29 species) and treelets (48 species) are abundant. Some common examples are:
Helicteres isora
Grewia abutilifolia
Grewia lacei
Desmodium motorium
Desmodium triangulare
Indigofera cassioides
Gardenia obtusifolia
Pavetta fruticosa
Strobilanthes apricus var. pedunculatus
Premna herbacea
Premna nana
Breynia fruticosa
Breynia glauca
Sauropus bicolor
Sauropus quadrangularis
Pueraria wallichii (a deciduous shrub; often scandent)
Mussaenda parva (a deciduous vine, woody climber, or scandent shrub)

Vines, often found in open, often burned, areas, are also common:
Dunbaria bella
Solena amplexicaulis
Streptocaulon juventas
Argyreia henryi

47 of the recorded vascular plant species live as epiphytes. Some of the most characteristic are evergreen, succulent, vines and creepers in the Asclepiadaceae, such as:
Dischidia major (has two kinds of leaves, i.e. normal and bladder-like ones which have a symbiotic relationship with ants)
Dischidia nummularia
Hoya kerrii (less common than Hoya verticillata)

There are numerous succulent, evergreen and deciduous Orchidaceae (orchids), such as:
Cleisomeria lanatum
Cleisostoma arietinum
Cymbidium ensifolium
Dendrobium lindleyi
Dendrobium porphyrophyllum
Dendrobium secundum
Eria acervata
Eria pannea
Rhynchogyna saccata
Vanda brunnea

2 deciduous Polypodiaceae (fern) species, both with characteristically distinct growth forms, are also frequently seen:
Drynaria rigidula
Platycerium wallichii

Of the 274 ground herbs which have been recorded, 111 (40%) are annuals. Some of the more common examples are:
Polygala longifolia
Biophytum umbraculum
Crotalaria alata
Crotalaria albida
Crotalaria neriifolia
Indigofera hirsuta
Uraria lacei
Blumea lacera
Gynura integrifolia
Pluchea polygonata

Robust, deciduous Poaceae (grasses) dominate and are all very combustible during the hot dry season from March to May. Some of the more common species are:
Apluda mutica
Aristida cumingiana
Arundinella setosa
Capillipedium assimile
Eulalia siamensis
Heteropogon contortus
Polytoca digitata
Schizachyrium sanguineum

Cyperaceae (sedges) are also common in this fire-prone habitat. Typical species include:
Bulbostylis barbata
Carex continua
Cyperus cuspidatus
Fimbristylis straminea
Rhynchospora rubra
Scleria kerrii
Scleria levis

Zingiberaceae (gingers) species, all of which are deciduous, are quite common. Typical species include:
Curcuma ecomata
Curcuma parviflora
Curcuma zedoaria
Globba nuda
Globba villosula
Kaempferia rotunda

Other common ground herbs include:
Barleria cristata
Geniosporum coloratum
Striga masuria (parasitic on the roots of other plants)
Aeginetia indica (parasitic on the roots of other plants)

Common ferns:
Adiantum philippense
Adiantum zollingeri
Cheilanthes tenuifolia
Selaginella ostenfeldii (a common, deciduous, ground fern ally)

Mixed evergreen/deciduous seasonal forest
From about 800 m elevation (600 m near permanent streams) to about 1000 m, there is a mixture of deciduous and evergreen trees.

217 tree species have been recorded, with only about 43% of them being deciduous trees. The tree flora is similar to that of the bamboo/deciduous forest.

The characteristic tall, emergent, evergreen, dipterocarps, which have large gray trunks, small leaves, and open, broad crowns, are:
Dipterocarpus costatus
Dipterocarpus turbinatus

In contrast, the deciduous dipterocarp-oak forest has large-leaved dipterocarps.

Other common tree species:
Mangifera caloneura
Eugenia albiflora
Balakata baccata (shared with evergreen forest)

Other tall evergreen trees:
Duabanga grandiflora
Irvingia malayana

Some common deciduous canopy trees are:
Lagerstroemia cochinchinensis var. ovalifolia
Lagerstroemia tomentosa
Spondias pinnata
Terminalia mucronata
Engelhardia serrata

Common evergreen understory trees include:
Garcinia speciosa
Lithocarpus elegans
Scleropyrum wallichianum var. siamensis
Turpinia pomifera
Knema laurina
Cinnamomum iners
Baccaurea ramiflora

A common deciduous understory tree:
Bauhinia variegata

71 treelet and 19 shrub species have been recorded. Common treelets and shrubs include:
Millettia caerulea (deciduous)

Ixora cibdela var. puberula (evergreen)
Psychotria ophioxyloides (evergreen)

Woody climbers are common. 62 species have been recorded, including the following deciduous species:
Combretum trifoliatum
Combretum latifolium
Ventilago denticulata

Evergreen species that are common in this biozone, especially along streams, include:
Combretum sundaicum
Rhamnus nepalensis
Tetrastigma laoticum

57 of the vascular plant species grow as epiphytes. The most specious groups are the figs (Moraceae, many of which are epiphytes only when young), orchids, and pteridophytes, but the Gesneriaceae and Loranthaceae are also represented.

Characteristic epiphytes are:
Bulbophyllum congestum
Bulbophyllum propinquum

Typical hemiparasites include:
Helixanthera pulchra
Dendrophthoe pentandra

The ground flora is diverse and includes both annual, perennial, deciduous and evergreen species. Of the 278 ground herbs recorded, 25% are annual. Common deciduous herbs include:
Strobilanthes anfractuosus
Ruellia siamensis
Begonia integrifolia
Zingiber kerrii
Globba villosula

Evergreen herb species are more common (comprising 60% of ground perennials) and include:
Tacca chantrieri
Amomum uliginosum

Typical ferns include:
Thelypteris arida
Cibotium barometz

Primary evergreen seasonal forest (without pine)
The upper part of the mixed evergreen/deciduous forest usually merges with the lower part of the evergreen forest at  900-950 m elevation.

Evergreen forest supports more tree species than any of the other forest types. 250 species have been recorded, of which only 67 (27%) are deciduous.

The evergreen forest has a wide variety of trees, with no dominant species or genera. Trees belong to diverse families, such as Lauraceae, Fagaceae, Theaceae, Moraceae, Magnoliaceae, and other families.

Characteristic evergreen canopy trees include:
Alseodaphne andersonii
Beilschmiedia aff. intermedia
Cryptocarya amygdalina
Artocarpus lanceolata

Several gigantic "strangling" figs:
Ficus altissima
Ficus benjamina

Characteristic Fagaceae species are:
Quercus vestita
Quercus glabricupula
Quercus incana
Quercus lineata

Castanopsis spp. tend to be shared with other forest types, including:
Castanopsis acuminatissima
Castanopsis armata

Other characteristic evergreen trees include:
Pyrenaria garrettiana
Garcinia mckeaniana
Casearia grewiifolia var. gelonioides
Chionanthus sutepensis
Elaeocarpus prunifolius
Dysoxylum aff. hamiltonii
Ostodes paniculata
Diospyros malabarica

A few of the larger deciduous canopy species include:
Michelia champaca
Michelia baillonii
Homalium ceylanicum
Melia toosendan
Morus macroura

Most also occur in the deciduous forest types.

Some of the deciduous trees which are restricted to evergreen forest are relatively rare, including:
Hovenia dulcis
Acrocarpus fraxinifolius
Litsea zeylanica

Other deciduous trees more typical of deciduous forest types sometimes spread up into evergreen forest due to fires or human disturbance. Common tree species shared with other forest types include:
Balakata baccata
Schima wallichii
Gluta obovata
Duabanga grandiflora
Mischocarpus pentapetalus

The understory is denser than that of forests at lower elevations and is especially diverse in stream valleys. Understory trees include:
Phoebe lanceolata
Acronychia pedunculata
Sarcosperma arboreum
Diospyros glandulosa

The following are also common, but grow in disturbed places.
Styrax benzoides
Maesa ramentacea

Some understory evergreen tree species, rarely exceeding 15 m tall, include:
Elaeocarpus prunifolius
Semecarpus cochinchinensis
Turpinia pomifera
Eugenia fruticosa
Actinodaphne henryi
Helicia nilagirica

Understory deciduous tree species include:
Spondias axillaris
Engelhardia spicata

Treelets and shrubs (91 and 22 recorded species, respectively) are numerous. Characteristic treelets include:
Vernonia volkameriifolia
Glochidion kerrii
Debregeasia longifolia
Archidendron glomeriflorum
Areca laosensis
Litsea salicifolia
Litsea cubeba

Characteristic evergreen shrubs in moist areas include:
Psychotria ophioxyloides
Phlogacanthus curviflorus

Shaded, undisturbed stream valleys often have:
Pandanus penetrans
Musa itinerans

The following species are also common:
Clerodendrum serratum var. wallichii
Ardisia virens
Euodia triphylla

A high species richness of woody climbers (78 species) is a notable feature of evergreen forest. Some characteristic evergreen examples include:
Toddalia asiatica
Ficus parietalis
Bauhinia glauca ssp. tenuiflora
Combretum punctatum ssp. squamosum
Uncaria macrophylla

The following are also common:
Tetrastigma laoticum
Tetrastigma obovatum
Mucuna macrocarpa (also in mixed evergreen/deciduous forest)

Rattans (the following of which are also evergreen woody climbers) include:
Calamus kerrianus (range from  700-1525 m, primarily in mixed and evergreen forests; an evergreen woody climber)
Plectocomia kerriana (known only from the upper Chang Khian valley at 1350-1400 m; an evergreen woody climber)
Calamus arborescens (known only from the middle Chang Khian Valley at 1050 m; a treelet or shrub)

There are numerous epiphytes in the evergreen forest. The "strangling" figs begin life as epiphytes:
Ficus superba
Sorbus verrucosa (very rare)

Characteristic epiphytic shrubs include:
Rhododendron veitchianum

There are several evergreen hemiparasitic species belonging to the family Loranthaceae:
Macrosolen cochinchinensis
Viscum ovalifolium
Viscum orientale
Fagraea ceilanica (very rare)

Characteristic epiphytic vines include:
Rhaphidophora glauca (uncommon species)
Hoya siamica

Epiphytic herbs are almost all perennials. Characteristic species include:
Hedychium ellipticum
orchids
Bulbophyllum bittnerianum
Coelogyne schultesii
Trichotosia dasyphylla
ferns
Lepisorus nudus
Davallodes membranulosum
Gesneriaceae
Didymocarpus wattianus
Aeschynanthus hosseusii

The herbaceous ground flora (321 recorded species) is very diverse and includes numerous species of dicots, monocots, and ferns. Some of the most characteristic ferns in open, fire-damaged place are:
Brainea insignis
Dicranopteris linearis

Some characteristic ferns in shaded, mostly pristine areas are:
Arachniodes henryi
Tectaria herpetocaulos
Thelypteris subelata
Diplazium dilatatum

Some common dicots are:
Impatiens violaeflora
Hydrocotyle siamica
Ophiorrhiza hispidula
Geophila repens
Wedelia montana var. wallichii
Pilea trinervia

Common herbaceous monocots are:
Aneilema sinicum
Commelina diffusa
Murdannia gigantea
Globba kerrii
Globba villosula
Zingiber smilesianum
Acorus gramineus, an epilithic rheophyte
Amorphophallus corrugatus
Vanilla siamensis (very rare)
Carex baccans

Parasitic or saprophytic members of the ground flora include several Balanophora species and others:
Balanophora abbreviata
Balanophora fungosa ssp. indica
Aeginetia indica
Sapria himalayana

Rare orchids include:
Epipogium roseum
Stereosandra javanica

Primary evergreen seasonal forest (with pine)
On fire-prone, exposed ridges at elevations of about 950–1,800 m, Pinus kesiya grows together with other evergreen forest tree species. In some areas, it is the dominant tree.

Some species more commonly found with Pinus kesiya than elsewhere, mostly due to the acidic lower pH of the soil, include:
Viburnum inopinatum
Helicia nilagirica
Myrica esculenta
Castanopsis argyrophylla
Quercus brandisiana (deciduous)
Quercus lenticellata

Where fires are particularly frequent, plants of deciduous dipterocarp-oak forest spread up into the pine forests at much higher elevations than is typical, including:
Craibiodendron stellatum
Vaccinium sprengelii
Anneslea fragrans
Aporosa villosa

In such areas, trees of the Fagaceae family are also common, including:
Castanopsis armata
Castanopsis tribuloides
Lithocarpus elegans
Lithocarpus fenestratus
Quercus vestita

Altogether 99 tree species have been recorded, of which only 27 (27%) are deciduous.

The ground flora includes 263 recorded herb species, both annuals (32%) and perennials (68%). Annual herbs include:
Blumeopsis flava
Anaphalis margaritacea
Lobelia nicotianifolia
Exacum pteranthum

Some deciduous, perennial counterparts are:
Inula cappa
Pratia begonifolia, a creeper
Anthogonium gracile
Oleandra undulata
Kuniwatsukia cuspidata

Epiphytes (86 recorded species) are especially conspicuous and include both evergreen species (68%) and annual or deciduous ones (32%). Epiphytic, hemi-parasitic Loranthaceae, all evergreen shrubs, are common:
Dendrophthoe pentandra
Helixanthera parasitica
Macrosolen avenis
Scurrula ferruginea
Viscum ovalifolium

Autotrophic evergreen, epiphytic and epilithic shrubs are frequently encountered:
Agapetes hosseana
Aeschynanthus hildebrandii
Aeschynanthus hosseusii

Some common evergreen epiphytic and epilithic herbs are:
Vittaria flexuosa
Elaphoglossum yoshinagae
Lepisorus bicolor
Pyrrosia stigmosa

Some common deciduous epiphytic and epilithic herbs are:
Didymocarpus aureoglandulosus
Didymocarpus kerrii
Araiostegia pulchra
Crypsinus cruciformis
Crypsinus oxylobus
Drynaria propinqua
Microsorum membranaceum

Evergreen epiphytic Orchidaceae species include:
Cleisostoma fuerstenbergianum
Coelogyne trinervis
Dendrobium christyanum
Dendrobium cariniferum
Pholidota articulata
Trichotosia dasyphylla

Deciduous epiphytic Orchidaceae species include:
Bulbophyllum secundum
Bulbophyllum suavissimum
Dendrobium falconeri
Dendrobium heterocarpum
Diploprora championii
Oberonia pachyphylla
Zeuxine affinis (a delicate, deciduous, saprophytic ground herb still commonly found in evergreen/pine areas)

Rare or extinct orchid species include:
Phaius tankervilleae (a particularly showy, evergreen ground orchid, perhaps extirpated from the park)
Tainia viridifusca (deciduous, with highly conspicuous inflorescences; extremely rare)

35 vine species have been recorded, including:
Codonopsis javanica (evergreen)
Clitoria mariana (deciduous)
Shuteria involucrata (deciduous)

Summit flora
The summit flora has been significantly altered, especially after the original primary evergreen forest was cleared and replaced with cultivated trees on the summit of Doi Pui in 1955. The soil has also become much more acidic.

Some of the original epiphytic flora has returned to the summit of Doi Pui, such as:
Agapetes hosseana
Aeschynanthus lineatus
Cheirostylis griffithii
Trichotosia dasyphylla
Crypsinus cruciformis
Crypsinus oxylobus
Lepisorus heterolepis
Microsorum membranaceum
Polypodium amoenum

Some evergreen herbs which have returned, albeit in diminished populations, include:
Hydrocotyle siamica
Strobilanthes anfractuosus
Strobilanthes consors
Aspidistra sutepensis

Deciduous herbs are more common, including:
Elsholtzia winitiana
Globba clarkei
Hypoxis aurea
Arisaema erubescens
Asparagus filicinus
Paris polyphylla
Crepidium acuminatum
Crepidium orbiculare
Habenaria stenopetala

9 plant species, all of which are rare or down to a few individuals, are entirely restricted to summit areas between 1620 and 1685 m above sea level. They are:
Poa annua
Hedychium villosum
Thalictrum foliolosum
Aeschynanthus lineatus
Strobilanthes consors
Alpinia blepharocalyx
Cleisostoma rolfeanum
Cymbidium tracyanum
Dendrobium sutepense

However, several species have disappeared from the summit:
Camellia connata
Paramignya surasiana
Euonymus colonoides
Hoya engleriana
Dendrobium sutepense

Mountains in Thailand that more or less preserve the original vegetation at above 1650 m are Doi Inthanon (2565 m), Doi Chang (1975 m), and Doi Lang Ka (2031 m).

Disturbed areas and secondary growth
A total of 288 species of ground herbs survives in disturbed areas or secondary growth. 144 species are annuals, and 144 species are perennials. There are numerous annual tertiary growth herbaceous weeds, all of which require exposure to sunlight for germination and growth. Some of the more common species found at all elevations include:
Urena lobata
Triumfetta rhomboidea
Mimosa pudica var. hispida
Passiflora foetida
Borreria laevis
Hedyotis corymbosa
Mitracarpus villosus
Ageratum conyzoides
Bidens pilosa
Conyza sumatrensis
Crassocephalum crepidioides
Eupatorium odoratum
Spilanthes paniculata
Synedrella nodiflora
Vernonia cinerea
Physalis angulata
Scoparia dulcis
Justicia procumbens
Euphorbia heterophylla
Euphorbia hirta
Phyllanthus amarus
Phyllanthus urinaria

Monocot weeds are also diverse and abundant. Some common examples are:
Commelina diffusa
Cyperus cyperoides
Cyperus kyllingia
Fimbristylis dichotoma
Arundinella setosa
Cyrtococcum accrescens
Cyrtococcum oxyphyllum
Digitaria setigera
Eragrostis nigra
Paspalum conjugatum
Sacciolepis indica
Setaria palmifolia
Setaria parviflora
Sporobolus diandrus

Robust perennial grasses are especially common in upland areas. They are robust, evergreen, and very persistent weeds in open, fire-damaged, upland areas, and include:
Apluda mutica
Imperata cylindrica var. major
Pennisetum pedicellatum
Phragmites vallatoria
Themeda triandra
Thysanolaena latifolia
Eupatorium adenophorum
Pteridium aquilinum

Naturalized woody weeds that often dominate open, disturbed areas are:
Mimosa pigra
Solanum verbascifolium
Lantana camara

Secondary growth treelets (36 species) and trees (81 species) are common seen. If left undisturbed, they are replaced by primary forest trees. Some typical examples are:
Albizia chinensis
Leucaena leucocephala (both introduced and cultivated, and often becomes locally naturalized)
Rhus chinensis
Callicarpa arborea
Glochidion sphaerogynum
Macaranga denticulata
Mallotus paniculatus
Mallotus philippensis
Ficus fistulosa
Ficus hispida
Trema orientalis

In human settlements
Common shade trees include:
Samanea saman
Ficus religiosa
Ceiba pentandra

Some flowers and shrubs are:
Hibiscus rosa-sinensis
Bougainvillea spectabilis
Oroxylum indicum (has flowers and young fruits which are edible)
Eryngium foetidum
Canna hybrid spp.

Medicinal plants:
Jatropha curcas
Ricinus communis (castor)

Exotic ornamental plants:
Bauhinia purpurea
Delonix regia
Senna spectabilis
Lagerstroemia speciosa
Jacaranda obtusifolia ssp. rhombifolia

Plants species with large, colourful inflorescences, which have now escaped cultivation and are extirpating native species:
Tithonia diversifolia
Euphorbia pulcherrima

Plants used by local people
In the Hmong village of Doi Pui, located within the park boundaries, plant species utilized by the local people include the following.

wild fruits: Phyllanthus emblica, Protium serratum
local vegetation: Diplazium, Lasia spinosa
orchards: Dendrocalamus hamiltonii, Diplazium esculentum
general healing: Betula alnoides, Cryptolepis dubia, Globba nisbetiana, Neuropeltis racemosa
fever relief: Thunbergia laurifolia, Tithonia diversfolia
healing and body anti-infective: Adiantum erylliae, Chromolaena odorata, Ricinus communis
buffer zone between forest and agricultural areas: Sterculia macrophylla, Sterculia urens, Sterculia villosa
dyes: Tephrosia purpurea, Artocarpus chama, Artocarpus lacucha
burial ceremonies: Ixora sp., Rothmannia sootepensis
communication with ancestral spirits: Pavetta indica
placed on ears of sick people: Bombax anceps
coffin wood: Magnolia baillonii, Magnolia garrettii
hunting dart poison: resin of Antiaris toxicaria
fish poison: Mucuna macrocarpa
irritants for humans: Mallotus barbatus, Dendrocnide sp.
construction, low strength: Castanopsis diversifolia, Castanopsis acuminatissima, Schima wallichii
construction, preferred: Protium serratum, Canarium euphyllum, Canarium subulatum
agricultural tools: Memecylon plebejum, Tristaniopsis burmanica
charcoal production: Gluta glabra, Semecarpus cochinchinensis
bamboos: Dendrocalamus hamiltonii, Thyrsostachys siamensis, Bambusa sp.
animal feed: Cyperus iria, Brachiaria distachya

List of species by family

Angiospermae, Dicotyledoneae

Ranunculaceae
Clematis buchananiana
Clematis eichleri
Clematis sikkimensis
Clematis smilacifolia
Clematis subumbellata
Delphinium siamense
Naravelia siamensis
Thalictrum foliolosum

Dilleniaceae
Dillenia aurea
Dillenia parviflora
Dillenia pentagyna

Magnoliaceae
Magnolia liliifera
Manglietia garrettii
Michelia baillonii
Michelia champaca
Michelia floribunda

Schisandraceae
Kadsura heteroclita

Annonaceae

Anomianthus dulcis
Artabotrys sp.
Desmos dumosus
Desmos sootepense
Ellipelopsis cherrevensis
Fissistigma oblongum
Fissistigma sp.
Goniothalamus griffithii
Miliusa cuneata
Miliusa thorelii
Miliusa velutina
Mitrephora vandaeflora
Polyalthia debilis
Polyalthia littoralis
Polyalthia simiarum
Polyalthia sp.
Uvaria rufa

Menispermaceae

Cissampelos hispida
Cissampelos pareira
Cocculus laurifolius
Cyclea atjehensis
Cyclea barbata
Cyclea polypetala
Cyclea varians
Diploclisia glaucescens
Pachygone dasycarpa
Parabaena sagittata
Pericampylus glaucus
Stephania brevipes
Stephania elegans
Stephania glabra
Stephania japonica
Stephania oblata
Tiliacora triandra
Tinomiscium petiolare
Tinospora crispa
Tinospora sinensis

Berberidaceae
Mahonia nepalensis

Lardizabalaceae
Parvatia brunoniana

Papaveraceae
Papaver somniferum

Cruciferae
Brassica juncea
Rorippa dubia

Capparaceae
Capparis disticha
Capparis kerrii
Capparis pyrifolia
Capparis sepiaria
Cleome rutidosperma
Cleome viscosa
Crateva magna
Crateva religiosa

Violaceae
Scyphellandra pierrei
Viola pilosa

Pittosporaceae
Pittosporum napaulense

Polygalaceae

Polygala chinensis
Polygala longifolia
Polygala persicariaefolia
Polygala tricholopha
Polygala triflora
Polygala umbonata
Salomonia cantoniensis
Salomonia longiciliata
Securidaca inappendiculata
Xanthophyllum flavescens
Xanthophyllum virens

Caryophyllaceae
Drymaria diandra
Myosoton aquaticum
Stellaria monosperma

Portulacaceae
Portulaca oleracea

Guttiferae

Calophyllum polyanthum
Cratoxylum cochinchinense
Cratoxylum formosum
Cratoxylum maingayi
Garcinia cowa
Garcinia mckeaniana
Garcinia merguensis
Garcinia speciosa
Garcinia thorelii
Garcinia xanthochymus
Hypericum japonicum
Mammea siamensis
Mesua ferrea

Flacourtiaceae

Casearia flexuosa
Casearia graveolens
Casearia grewiifolia
Flacourtia indica
Homalium ceylanicum
Xylosma brachystachys

Theaceae

Adinandra integerrima
Anneslea fragrans
Camellia oleifera
Camellia sinensis
Eurya acumminata
Eurya nitida
Gordonia dalglieshiana
Pyrenaria camelliiflora
Pyrenaria garrettiana
Schima wallichii
Ternstroemia gymnanthera

Actinidiaceae
Actinidia rubricaulis

Saururaceae
Houttuynia cordata
Saurauia napaulensis
Saurauia roxburghii

Dipterocarpaceae

Dipterocarpus costatus
Dipterocarpus obtusifolius
Dipterocarpus tuberculatus
Dipterocarpus turbinatus
Hopea odorata
Shorea farinosa
Shorea obtusa
Shorea roxburghii
Shorea siamensis

Malvaceae

Abelmoschus moschatus
Hibiscus furcatus
Hibiscus glanduliferus
Hibiscus mutabilis
Hibiscus surattensis
Kydia calycina
Pavonia repanda
Sida mysorensis
Sida rhombifolia
Thespesia lampas
Urena lobata

Bombacaceae
Bombax anceps
Bombax ceiba

Sterculiaceae

Byttneria aspera
Byttneria pilosa
Eriolaena candollei
Firmiana colorata
Helicteres angustifolia
Helicteres elongata
Helicteres hirsuta
Helicteres isora
Helicteres lanceolata
Melochia corchorifolia
Pterocymbium tinctorium
Pterospermum acerifolium
Pterospermum grandiflorum
Pterospermum semisagittatum
Reevesia pubescens
Sterculia balanghas
Sterculia lanceolata
Sterculia pexa
Sterculia urens
Sterculia villosa

Tiliaceae

Berrya mollis
Colona flagrocarpa
Colona floribunda
Corchorus aestuans
Grewia abutilifolia
Grewia acuminata
Grewia eriocarpa
Grewia hirsuta
Grewia lacei
Grewia laevigata
Grewia polygama
Microcos paniculata
Muntingia calabura
Schoutenia glomerata
Triumfetta pilosa
Triumfetta rhomboidea

Elaeocarpaceae
Elaeocarpus braceanus
Elaeocarpus floribundus
Elaeocarpus lanceifolius
Elaeocarpus petiolatus
Elaeocarpus prunifolius
Elaeocarpus sphaericus
Elaeocarpus stipularis
Sloanea tomentosa

Linaceae
Reinwardtia indica

Erythroxylaceae
Erythroxylum cuneatum

Malpighiaceae
Aspidopterys nutans
Aspidopterys tomentosa
Hiptage benghalensis

Oxalidaceae
Biophytum reinwardtii
Biophytum sensitivum
Biophytum umbraculum
Oxalis corniculata
Oxalis corymbosa

Balsaminaceae
Impatiens curvipes
Impatiens garrettii
Impatiens mengtszeana
Impatiens violaeflora

Rutaceae

Acronychia pedunculata
Aegle marmelos
Clausena excavata
Clausena lenis
Euodia glomerata
Euodia meliifolia
Euodia triphylla
Euodia viticina
Feronia limonia
Glycosmis puberula
Luvunga scandens
Micromelum falcatum
Micromelum hirsutum
Micromelum minutum
Paramignya scandens
Toddalia asiatica
Zanthoxylum acanthopodium

Simaroubaceae
Brucea javanica
Brucea mollis
Eurycoma longifolia
Harrisonia perforata
Picrasma javanica

Irvingiaceae
Irvingia malayana

Ochnaceae
Ochna integerrima

Burseraceae
Canarium subulatum
Garuga pinnata
Protium serratum

Meliaceae

Aglaia lawii
Aphanamixis polystachya
Aphanamixis sp.
Chukrasia tabularis
Cipadessa baccifera
Dysoxylum aff. cauliflorum
Dysoxylum excelsum
Dysoxylum aff. hamiltonii
Heynea trijuga
Melia toosendan
Munronia humilis
Sandoricum koetjape
Toona ciliata
Walsura intermedia
Walsura trichostemon

Olacaceae
Anacolosa ilicoides
Olax imbricata
Olax scandens
Schoepfia fragrans

Icacinaceae
Apodytes dimidiata
Iodes vitiginea
Pittosporopsis kerrii
Platea latifolia

Cardiopteridaceae
Cardiopteris quinqueloba

Aquifoliaceae
Ilex englishii
Ilex umbellulata
Ilex sp.

Celastraceae
Celastrus monospermus
Celastrus paniculatus
Euonymus similis
Euonymus sootepensis
Lophopetalum wallichii
Reissantia indica
Siphonodon celastrineus

Rhamnaceae
Berchemia floribunda
Colubrina pubescens
Hovenia dulcis
Rhamnus nepalensis
Ventilago denticulata
Ziziphus oenoplia
Ziziphus rugosa

Vitaceae

Ampelocissus martinii
Ampelocissus sp.
Cayratia japonica
Cayratia pedata
Cayratia trifolia
Cayratia sp.
Cissus adnata
Cissus assamica
Cissus discolor
Cissus hastata
Cissus repanda
Cissus repens
Parthenocissus semicordata
Tetrastigma campylocarpum
Tetrastigma crassipes
Tetrastigma cruciatum
Tetrastigma delavayi
Tetrastigma garrettii
Tetrastigma aff. harmandii
Tetrastigma laoticum
Tetrastigma obovatum
Tetrastigma quadrangulum
Tetrastigma serrulatum
Tetrastigma siamense
Tetrastigma yunnanense
Tetrastigma sp.

Leeaceae
Leea guineensis
Leea herbacea
Leea indica
Leea macrophylla
Leea rubra

Sapindaceae
Allophylus cobbe
Dimocarpus longan
Harpullia cupanioides
Lepisanthes tetraphylla
Litchi chinensis
Mischocarpus pentapetalus
Sapindus rarak
Schleichera oleosa

Aceraceae
Acer laurinum

Staphyleaceae
Turpinia nepalensis
Turpinia pomifera

Sabiaceae
Meliosma pinnata
Meliosma simplicifolia

Anacardiaceae

Buchanania glabra
Buchanania cochinchinensis
Gluta obovata
Gluta usitata
Holigarna kurzii
Lannea coromandelica
Mangifera caloneura
Pegia nitida
Rhus chinensis
Rhus rhetsoides
Rhus succedanea
Semecarpus cochinchinensis
Spondias axillaris
Spondias pinnata

Connaraceae
Cnestis palala
Connarus semidecandrus
Rourea minor

Fabaceae

Mimosoideae

Acacia concinna
Acacia megaladena
Adenanthera microsperma
Albizia chinensis
Albizia crassiramea
Albizia garrettii
Albizia lebbeck
Albizia lucidior
Albizia odoratissima
Archidendron clypearia
Archidendron glomeriflorum
Entada rheedii
Mimosa diplotricha
Mimosa pigra
Mimosa pudica
Samanea saman
Xylia xylocarpa

Caesalpinioideae

Acrocarpus fraxinifolius
Afzelia xylocarpa
Bauhinia bracteata
Bauhinia glauca
Bauhinia hirsuta
Bauhinia ornata
Bauhinia purpurea
Bauhinia racemosa
Bauhinia variegata
Bauhinia viridescens
Caesalpinia cucullata
Caesalpinia digyna
Caesalpinia furfuracea
Caesalpinia hymenocarpa
Caesalpinia mimosoides
Caesalpinia sappan
Cassia bakeriana
Cassia fistula
Chamaecrista leschenaultiana
Peltophorum dasyrrhachis
Pterolobium macropterum
Senna spectabilis
Senna tora
Sindora siamensis

Papilionoideae

Abrus precatorius
Abrus pulchellus
Aeschynomene americana
Afgekia filipes
Alysicarpus bupleurifolius
Apios carnea
Butea monosperma
Cajanus cajan
Cajanus crassus
Cajanus goensis
Cajanus scarabaeoides
Cajanus volubilis
Callerya atropurpurea
Canavalia ensiformis
Centrosema pubescens
Christia obcordata
Clitoria macrophylla
Clitoria mariana
Crotalaria acicularis
Crotalaria alata
Crotalaria albida
Crotalaria assamica
Crotalaria bracteata
Crotalaria dubia
Crotalaria ferruginea
Crotalaria kurzii
Crotalaria medicaginea
Crotalaria neriifolia
Crotalaria pallida
Crotalaria prostrata
Crotalaria sessiliflora
Crotalaria shanica
Crotalaria zanzibarica
Cruddasia insignis
Cyclocarpa stellaris
Cylista scariosa
Dalbergia cana
Dalbergia cultrata
Dalbergia lacei
Dalbergia lanceolaria
Dalbergia oliveri
Dalbergia ovata
Dalbergia rimosa
Dalbergia stipulacea
Dalbergia velutina
Dalbergia volubilis
Derris robusta
Desmodium elegans
Desmodium flexuosum
Desmodium gangeticum
Desmodium gyroides
Desmodium heterocarpon
Desmodium laxiflorum
Desmodium longipes
Desmodium megaphyllum
Desmodium motorium
Desmodium multiflorum
Desmodium oblatum
Desmodium oblongum
Desmodium pulchellum
Desmodium renifolium
Desmodium repandum
Desmodium triangulare
Desmodium triflorum
Desmodium triquetrum
Desmodium velutinum
Diphyllarium mekongense
Dolichos tenuicaulis
Dumasia leiocarpa
Dunbaria bella
Dunbaria fusca
Dunbaria podocarpa
Dunbaria villosa
Dysolobium dolichoides
Dysolobium grande
Dysolobium pilosum
Endosamara racemosa
Eriosema chinense
Erythrina stricta
Erythrina suberosa
Erythrina subumbrans
Flemingia lineata
Flemingia paniculata
Flemingia sootepensis
Flemingia strobilifera
Grona grahamii
Indigofera cassioides
Indigofera dosua
Indigofera hirsuta
Indigofera laxiflora
Indigofera linnaei
Indigofera squalida
Lablab purpureus
Lespedeza parviflora
Lespedeza pinetorum
Macroptilium atropurpureum
Macrotyloma uniflorum
Millettia brandisiana
Millettia caerulea
Millettia extensa
Millettia aff. glaucescens
Millettia latifolia
Millettia macrostachya
Millettia pachycarpa
Millettia xylocarpa
Mucuna bracteata
Mucuna macrocarpa
Mucuna pruriens
Ormosia sumatrana
Pachyrhizus erosus
Phaseolus vulgaris
Phylacium majus
Pterocarpus macrocarpus
Pueraria alopecuroides
Pueraria imbricata
Pueraria mirifica
Pueraria phaseoloides
Pueraria stricta
Pueraria wallichii
Pycnospora lutescens
Rhynchosia bracteata
Shuteria hirsuta
Shuteria involucrata
Smithia ciliata
Spatholobus parviflorus
Spatholobus spirei
Spatholobus suberectus
Stylosanthes sundaica
Tephrosia kerrii
Tephrosia purpurea
Teyleria barbata
Uraria campanulata
Uraria cordifolia
Uraria lacei
Uraria lagopodioides
Uraria poilanei
Vigna dalzelliana
Vigna grahamiana
Vigna radiata
Vigna umbellata
Vigna vexillata
Zornia gibbosa

Rosaceae
Agrimonia nepalensis
Eriobotrya bengalensis
Parinari anamensis
Prunus arborea
Prunus cerasoides
Prunus javanica
Prunus wallichii
Rubus alceifolius
Rubus blepharoneurus
Rubus ellipticus
Rubus sorbifolius
Sorbus verrucosa

Saxifragaceae

Dichroa febrifuga

Grossulariaceae (Escalloniaceae)
Itea puberula
Itea riparia
Polyosma elongata

Droseraceae
Drosera burmannii
Drosera peltata

Rhizophoraceae
Carallia brachiata

Combretaceae

Anogeissus acuminata
Calycopteris floribunda
Combretum deciduum
Combretum griffithii
Combretum latifolium
Combretum procursum
Combretum punctatum
Quisqualis indica
Terminalia alata
Terminalia bellirica
Terminalia chebula
Terminalia glaucifolia
Terminalia mucronata
Terminalia triptera

Myrtaceae

Decaspermum parviflorum
Eugenia albiflora
Eugenia cinerea
Eugenia claviflora
Eugenia cumini
Eugenia formosa
Eugenia fruticosa
Eugenia aff. globiflora
Eugenia grata
Eugenia megacarpa
Eugenia oblata
Eugenia tetragona
Tristaniopsis burmanica

Lecythidaceae
Careya arborea

Melastomataceae
Melastoma malabathricum
Memecylon plebejum
Memecylon scutellatum
Osbeckia chinensis
Osbeckia stellata
Sonerila erecta
Sonerila griffithii

Lythraceae
Ammannia baccifera
Lagerstroemia cochinchinensis
Lagerstroemia macrocarpa
Lagerstroemia venusta
Lagerstroemia villosa
Rotala diversifolia
Rotala mexicana
Rotala rotundifolia

Crypteroniaceae
Crypteronia paniculata

Sonneratiaceae
Duabanga grandiflora

Onagraceae
Ludwigia adscendens
Ludwigia hyssopifolia

Passifloraceae
Adenia cardiophylla
Adenia heterophylla
Adenia pinnasecta
Passiflora foetida
Passiflora siamica

Cucurbitaceae

Coccinia grandis
Cucumis cf. hystrix
Cucumis maderaspatanus
Gomphogyne heterosperma
Gymnopetalum chinense
Gynostemma pentaphyllum
Hodgsonia heteroclita
Luffa cylindrica
Momordica charantia
Neoalsomitra angustipetala
Neoalsomitra integrifoliola
Neoalsomitra sarcophylla
Solena amplexicaulis
Thladiantha hookeri
Trichosanthes ovigera
Trichosanthes rubriflos
Trichosanthes smilacifolia
Trichosanthes tricuspidata
Zehneria marginata
Zehneria maysorensis
Zehneria wallichii

Begoniaceae
Begonia acetosella
Begonia integrifolia
Begonia laciniata
Begonia martabanica
Begonia siamensis
Begonia aff. sinensis
Begonia yunnanensis

Datiscaceae
Tetrameles nudiflora

Aizoaceae
Glinus oppositifolius
Mollugo pentaphylla

Umbelliferae
Centella asiatica
Hydrocotyle asiatica
Oenanthe javanica
Seseli siamicum

Araliaceae
Aralia montana
Brassaiopsis ficifolia
Brassaiopsis glomerulata
Heteropanax fragrans
Macropanax dispermus
Schefflera bengalensis
Schefflera pueckleri
Trevesia palmata

Alangiaceae
Alangium barbatum
Alangium chinense
Alangium kurzii
Alangium salviifolium

Comaceae
Mastixia euonymoides

Nyssaceae
Nyssa javanica

Caprifoliaceae
Lonicera ferruginea
Lonicera siamensis
Sambucus javanica
Viburnum cylindricum
Viburnum inopinatum

Rubiaceae

Adina trichotoma
Aidia yunnanensis
Anthocephalus chinensis
Aphaenandra uniflora
Argostemma ebracteolatum
Argostemma khasianum
Argostemma verticillatum
Borreria alata
Borreria brachystema
Borreria laevis
Borreria repens
Canthium glabrum
Canthium parvifolium
Canthium umbellatum
Catunaregam longispina
Catunaregam spathulifolia
Ceriscoides sessiliflora
Ceriscoides turgida
Cinchona pubescens
Dioecrescis erythroclada
Duperrea pavettifolia
Fagerlindia sinensis
Gardenia obtusifolia
Gardenia sootepensis
Geophila repens
Haldina cordifolia
Hedyotis auricularia
Hedyotis coronaria
Hedyotis corymbosa
Hedyotis diffusa
Hedyotis gracilipes
Hedyotis lindleyana
Hedyotis nalampooni
Hedyotis ovatifolia
Hedyotis pahompokae
Hedyotis pinifolia
Hedyotis quadrilocularis
Hedyotis tenelliflora
Hedyotis vestita
Hymenodictyon orixense
Hymenopogon parasiticus
Hyptianthera bracteata
Ixora butterwickii
Ixora cibdela
Ixora kerrii
Knoxia brachycarpa
Knoxia corymbosa
Knoxia mollis
Lasianthus kurzii
Lasianthus lucidus
Mitracarpus villosus
Mitragyna hirsuta
Mitragyna rotundifolia
Morinda angustifolia
Morinda tomentosa
Mussaenda kerrii
Mussaenda parva
Mussaenda sanderiana
Mycetia glandulosa
Mycetia gracilis
Mycetia longifolia
Mycetia rivicola
Ophiorrhiza hispidula
Ophiorrhiza ridleyana
Ophiorrhiza rosea
Ophiorrhiza villosa
Oxyceros horridus
Paederia pallida
Paederia pilifera
Paederia scandens
Paederia wallichii
Pavetta fruticosa
Pavetta indica
Pavetta tomentosa
Prismatomeris tetrandra
Psychotria adenophylla
Psychotria monticola
Psychotria ophioxyloides
Psychotria siamica
Rothmannia sootepensis
Rubia siamensis
Saprosma sp.
Spiradiclis caespitosa
Tarenna vanprukii
Tarennoidea wallichii
Uncaria macrophylla
Vangueria (Meyna) pubescens
Wendlandia scabra
Wendlandia tinctoria

Valerianaceae
Valeriana hardwickii

Compositae

Adenostemma lavenia
Ageratum conyzoides
Anaphalis adnata
Anaphalis margaritacea
Artemisia indica
Bidens pilosa
Blumea balsamifera
Blumea clarkei
Blumea fistulosa
Blumea gardneri
Blumea hossei
Blumea lacera
Blumea laciniata
Blumea lanceolaria
Blumea membranacea
Blumea mollis
Blumea napifolia
Blumea sessiliflora
Blumeopsis flava
Camchaya eberhardtii
Cissampelopsis corifolia
Conyza japonica
Conyza leucantha
Conyza stricta
Conyza sumatrensis
Crassocephalum crepidioides
Crepis chloroclada
Cyathocline purpurea
Dichrocephala integrifolia
Eclipta prostrata
Elephantopus scaber
Emilia prenanthoidea
Emilia sonchifolia
Ethulia conyzoides
Eupatorium adenophorum
Eupatorium cannabinum
Eupatorium odoratum
Galinsoga parviflora
Gnaphalium affine
Gnaphalium hypoleucum
Gnaphalium polycaulon
Gochnatia decora
Grangea maderaspatana
Gynura integrifolia
Gynura longifolia
Gynura pseudochina
Inula cappa
Inula indica
Inula nervosa
Inula wissmanniana
Ixeridium sagittarioides
Lactuca parishii
Laggera alata
Laggera aurita
Laggera pterodonta
Microglossa pyrifolia
Mikania cordata
Piloselloides hirsuta
Pluchea polygonata
Pterocaulon redolens
Saussurea peguensis
Sigesbeckia orientalis
Sonchus arvensis
Sonchus oleraceus
Sphaeranthus indicus
Spilanthes paniculata
Synedrella nodiflora
Synotis triligulata
Tithonia diversifolia
Tricholepis karensium
Tridax procumbens
Vernonia andersonii
Vernonia cinerea
Vernonia divergens
Vernonia parishii
Vernonia roxburghii
Vernonia silhetensis
Vernonia squamosa
Vernonia sutepensis
Vernonia volkameriifolia
Wedelia montana
Xanthium inaequilaterum
Youngia japonica

Campanulaceae
Codonopsis celebica
Codonopsis javanica
Codonopsis parviflora
Lobelia alsinoides
Lobelia nicotianifolia
Lobelia zeylanica
Pratia begonifolia
Wahlenbergia marginata

Sphenocleaceae
Sphenoclea zeylanica

Ericaceae
Agapetes hosseana
Agapetes variegata
Craibiodendron stellatum
Lyonia ovalifolia
Rhododendron moulmainense
Rhododendron veitchianum
Vaccinium sprengelii

Monotropaceae
Monotropa hypopitys

Primulaceae
Lysimachia lancifolia
Lysimachia peduncularis
Lysimachia remotiflon

Plantaginaceae
Plantago major

Myrsinaceae

Ardisia arborescens
Ardisia attenuata
Ardisia corymbifera
Ardisia crenata
Ardisia kerrii
Ardisia maculosa
Ardisia villosa
Ardisia virens
Embelia impressa
Embelia oblongifolia
Embelia pulchella
Embelia sessiliflora
Embelia sootepensis
Embelia subcoriacea
Embelia tsjeriam-cottam
Maesa montana
Maesa permollis
Maesa ramentacea
Rapanea yunnanensis

Sapotaceae
Madhuca stipulacea
Palaquium garrettii
Pouteria grandifolia
Sarcosperma arboreum
Xantolis burmanica

Ebenaceae

Diospyros castanea
Diospyros coaetanea
Diospyros ehretioides
Diospyros ferrea
Diospyros glandulosa
Diospyros malabarica
Diospyros martabanica
Diospyros mollis
Diospyros montana
Diospyros pilosanthera
Diospyros rhodocalyx
Diospyros undulata
Diospyros winitii

Symplocaceae
Symplocos cochinchinensis
Symplocos hookeri
Symplocos macrophylla
Symplocos racemosa
Symplocos sumuntia

Styracaceae
Styrax benzoides

Oleaceae

Chionanthus mala-elengi
Chionanthus ramiflorus
Chionanthus sutepensis
Fraxinus floribunda
Jasminum attenuatum
Jasminum funale
Jasminum nervosum
Jasminum scandens
Jasminum siamense
Myxopyrum smilacifolium
Olea dioica
Olea rosea
Olea salicifolia
Schrebera swietenioides

Apocynaceae

Aganosma cymosa
Aganosma marginata
Aganosma siamensis
Alstonia rostrata
Alstonia scholaris
Alyxia siamensis
Amalocalyx microlobus
Carissa spinarum
Chonemorpha megacalyx
Chonemorpha verrucosa
Holarrhena pubescens
Ichnocarpus frutescens
Melodinus cochinchinensis
Parameria laevigata
Pottsia laxiflora
Rauvolfia serpentina
Rauvolfia verticillata
Trachelospermum asiaticum
Urceola micrantha
Wrightia arborea

Asclepiadaceae

Atherolepis pierrei
Ceropegia sootepensis
Cryptolepis buchananii
Cynanchum corymbosum
Dischidia imbricata
Dischidia major
Dischidia nummularia
Dischidia obcordata
Dischidia singularis
Dischidia sp.
Genianthus laurifolius
Gymnema griffithii
Heterostemma siamicum
Hoya engleriana
Hoya kerrii
Hoya siamica
Hoya thomsonii
Hoya verticillata
Marsdenia cambodiensis
Marsdenia aff. eriocaulis
Marsdenia aff. tenacissima
Marsdenia tenacissima
Marsdenia thyrsiflora
Marsdenia tinctoria
Myriopteron extensum
Oxystelma esculentum
Raphistemma pulchellum
Streptocaulon juventas
Telosma pallida
Toxocarpus aff. grifpthii
Toxocarpus villosus
Vincetoxicum sp. (as Tylophora sp.)
Vincetoxicum fasciculatum (syn. Tylophora fasciculata)
Vincetoxicum himalaicum (as Tylophora aff. himalaica)
Vincetoxicum irrawadense (syn. Tylophora purpurea)
Vincetoxicum rotundifolium (syn. Tylophora rotundifolia)
Vincetoxicum sootepense (syn. Tylophora sootepensis)
Zygostelma benthamii

Loganiaceae
Buddleja asiatica
Fagraea ceilanica
Mitreola petiolata
Strychnos nux-vomica

Gentianaceae
Canscora decussata
Canscora diffusa
Exacum pteranthum
Exacum sutaepense
Exacum tetragonum
Swertia angustifolia
Swertia kachinensis

Hydrophyllaceae
Hydrolea zeylanica

Boraginaceae
Cordia mhaya
Cynoglossum lanceolatum
Ehretia acuminata
Heliotropium indicum
Tournefortia intonsa

Convolvulaceae

Argyreia aggregata
Argyreia capitiformis
Argyreia henryi
Argyreia kerrii
Argyreia obtecta
Argyreia osyrensis
Argyreia wallichii
Blinkworthia lycioides
Cuscuta reflexa
Erycibe subspicata
Evolvulus alsinoides
Ipomoea aquatica
Ipomoea cairica
Ipomoea hederifolia
Ipomoea nil
Ipomoea obscura
Ipomoea pes-tigridis
Ipomoea siamensis
Ipomoea sinensis
Ipomoea sp.
Jacquemontia paniculata
Merremia umbellata
Merremia vitifolia
Operculina turpethum
Porana racemosa
Porana spectabilis

Solanaceae
Capsicum aff. chamaecerasus
Physalis angulata
Solanum barbisetum
Solanum macrodon
Solanum nigrum
Solanum torvum
Solanum verbascifolium

Scrophulariaceae

Adenosma hirsutum
Alectra avensis
Buchnera cruciata
Centranthera cochinchinensis
Limnophila chinensis
Limnophila hayatae
Limnophila indica
Limnophila repens
Limnophila rugosa
Lindenbergia indica
Lindenbergia philippensis
Lindernia anagallis
Lindernia antipoda
Lindernia ciliata
Lindemia crustacea
Lindernia hookeri
Lindernia montana
Lindernia pusilla
Lindernia viscosa
Mazus pumilus
Scoparia dulcis
Sopubia fastigiata
Sopubia trifida
Striga asiatica
Striga masuria
Torenia benthamiana
Torenia flava
Torenia thorelii
Torenia violacea

Orobanchaceae
Aeginetia indica
Aeginetia pedunculata

Lentibulariaceae
Utricularia aurea
Utricularia bifida
Utricularia caerulea
Utricularia exoleta
Utricularia scandens
Utricularia striatula

Gesneriaceae

Aeschynanthus hildebrandii
Aeschynanthus hosseusii
Aeschynanthus lineatus
Aeschynanthus macranthus
Chirita anachoreta
Chirita brevipes
Chirita hamosa
Chirita micromusa
Chirita pumila
Didymocarpus aureoglandulosus
Didymocarpus kerrii
Didymocarpus siamensis
Didymocarpus wattianus
Epithema carnosum
Leptoboea multiflora
Paraboea kerrii
Petrocosmea kerrii
Rhynchoglossum obliquum
Rhynchotechum ellipticum
Rhynchotechum obovatum
Stauranthera grandiflora
Streptocarpus orientalis

Bignoniaceae

Fernandoa adenophylla
Jacaranda obtusifolia
Markhamia stipulata
Millingtonia hortensis
Oroxylum indicum
Radermachera glandulosa
Radermachera ignea
Stereospermum colais
Stereospermum fimbriatum
Stereospermum neuranthum

Acanthaceae

Andrographis laxiflora
Andrographis paniculata
Asystasia hispida
Asystasia salicifolia
Asystasiella neesiana
Barleria cristata
Barleria strigosa
Chroesthes lanceolata
Dicliptera roxburghiana
Dipteracanthus repens
Eranthemum tetragonum
Gymnostachyum signatum
Hemigraphis glaucescens
Hypoestes aff. purpurea
Justicia comata
Justicia procumbens
Justicia quadrifaria
Justicia aff. quadrifaria
Justicia ventricosa
Mananthes pallida
Nelsonia canescens
Neuracanthus tetragonostachyus
Ophiorrhiziphyllon macrobotryum
Perilepta siamensis
Peristrophe bicalyculata
Peristrophe lanceolaria
Phaulopsis dorsiflora
Phlogacanthus curviflorus
Pseuderanthemum aff. crenulatum
Pseuderanthemum latifolium
Pseuderanthemum parishii
Ruellia tuberosa
Rungia parviflora
Sericocalyx quadrifarius
Sericocalyx schomburgkii
Staurogyne obtusa
Strobilanthes anfractuosus
Strobilanthes apricus
Strobilanthes argentea
Strobilanthes consors
Strobilanthes imbricata
Strobilanthes aff. mucronato-productus
Strobilanthes rubroglandulosus
Strobilanthes serrata
Strobilanthes viscidus
Thunbergia alata
Thunbergia coccinea
Thunbergia geoffrayi
Thunbergia laurifolia
Thunbergia similis

Verbenaceae

Callicarpa arborea
Callicarpa rubella
Clerodendrum disparifolium
Clerodendrum fragrans
Clerodendrum glandulosum
Clerodendrum infortunatum
Clerodendrum paniculatum
Clerodendrum serratum
Congea tomentosa
Gmelina arborea
Lantana camara
Premna fulva
Premna herbacea
Premna latifolia
Premna nana
Premna pyramidata
Premna scandens
Premna villosa
Sphenodesme pentandra
Symphorema involucratum
Tectona grandis
Vitex canescens
Vitex glabrata
Vitex limonifolia
Vitex peduncularis
Vitex quinata

Labiatae

Achyrospermum densiflorum
Ajuga bracteosa
Anisomeles indica
Colquhounia elegans
Elsholtzia blanda
Elsholtzia winitiana
Eurysolen gracilis
Gomphostemma lucidum
Gomphostemma strobilinum
Gomphostemma wallichii
Hyptis capitata
Hyptis suaveolens
Leucas aspera
Leucas flaccida
Orthosiphon aristatus
Orthosiphon rubicundus
Orthosiphon sp.
Platostoma coloratum
Platostoma siamense
Platostoma sp.
Plectranthus coetsa
Plectranthus glabratus
Plectranthus hispidus
Plectranthus lophanthoides
Plectranthus ternifolius
Pogostemon auricularius
Pogostemon menthoides
Pogostemon purpurascens
Pogostemon wattii
Salvia riparia
Scutellaria glandulosa
Teucrium quadrifarium

Nyctaginaceae
Boerhavia diffusa
Mirabilis jalapa

Basellaceae
Basella alba

Chenopodiaceae
Chenopodium ficifolium

Amaranthaceae
Achyranthes bidentata
Aerva sanguinolenta
Alternanthera paronychioides
Alternanthera pungens
Altemanthera sessilis
Amaranthus spinosus
Amaranthus viridis
Psilotrichum ferrugineum

Polygonaceae
Fagopyrum esculentum
Polygonum barbatum
Polygonum chinense
Polygonum flaccidum
Polygonum nepalense
Polygonum odoratum
Polygonum plebeium

Aristolochiaceae
Aristolochia grandis
Aristolochia kerrii
Aristolochia pierrei
Aristolochia tagala
Aristolochia versicolor

Rafflesiaceae
Sapria himalayana

Piperaceae
Peperomia pellucida
Peperomia tetraphylla
Piper argyrophyllum
Piper boehmeriifolium
Piper longum
Piper muricatum
Piper aff. pedicellatum
Piper aff. peepuloides
Piper retrofractum

Chloranthaceae
Chloranthus erectus
Chloranthus nervosus
Sarcandra glabra

Myristicaceae
Horsfieldia amygdalina
Horsfieldia thorelii
Knema conferta
Knema laurina

Lauraceae

Actinodaphne henryi
Alseodaphne andersonii
Beilschmiedia aff. intermedia
Beilschmiedia aff. percoriacea
Cinnamomum camphora
Cinnamomum caudatum
Cinnamomum iners
Cinnamomum longipetiolatum
Cryptocarya amygdalina
Lindera caudata
Litsea albicans
Litsea cubeba
Litsea firma
Litsea glutinosa
Litsea monopetala
Litsea salicifolia
Litsea semecarpifolia
Litsea zeylanica
Machilus bombycina
Persea chartacea
Phoebe cathia
Phoebe lanceolata
Phoebe aff. pallida
Phoebe aff. neuranthoides
Potameia siamensis

Hernandiaceae
Illigera thorelii
Illigera trifoliata

Proteaceae
Helicia formosana
Helicia nilagirica
Heliciopsis terminalis

Thymelaeaceae
Aquilaria crassna
Daphne sureil
Enkleia siamensis
Linostoma persimile

Loranthaceae

Dendrophthoe curvata
Dendrophthoe lanosa
Dendrophthoe pentandra
Elytranthe albida
Ginalloa siamica
Helixanthera parasitica
Helixanthera pulchra
Macrosolen avenis
Macrosolen lowii
Scurrula atropurpurea
Scurrula ferruginea
Scurrula parasitica
Viscum articulatum
Viscum orientale
Viscum ovalifolium

Santalaceae
Scleropyrum wallichianum

Opiliaceae
Cansjera rheedei
Lepionurus sylvestris
Melientha suavis
Opilia amentacea

Balanophoraceae
Balanophora abbreviata
Balanophora fungosa
Balanophora latisepala
Balanophora laxiflora

Euphorbiaceae

Acalypha brachystachya
Acalypha kerrii
Alchornea tiliifolia
Aleurites moluccana
Antidesma acidum
Antidesma bunius
Antidesma ghaesembilla
Antidesma montanum
Antidesma sootepense
Aporosa villosa
Aporosa wallichii
Baccaurea ramiflora
Baliospermum montanum
Baliospermum siamense
Balakata baccata
Bischofia javanica
Breynia fruticosa
Breynia glauca
Bridelia affinis
Bridelia glauca
Bridelia retusa
Bridelia stipularis
Bridelia tomentosa
Cleidion spiciflorum
Cleistanthus hirsutulus
Croton crassifolius
Croton lachnocarpus
Croton robustus
Croton roxburghii
Dalechampia elongata
Daphniphyllum laurinum
Euphorbia bifida
Euphorbia heterophylla
Euphorbia hirta
Euphorbia lacei
Euphorbia parviflora
Euphorbia prostrata
Euphorbia pulcherrima
Euphorbia thymifolia
Falconeria insignis
Glochidion acuminatum
Glochidion assamicum
Glochidion coccineum
Glochidion eriocarpum
Glochidion hongkongense
Glochidion kerrii
Glochidion sphaerogynum
Homonoia riparia
Macaranga denticulata
Macaranga kurzii
Mallotus barbatus
Mallotus khasianus
Mallotus oblongifolius
Mallotus paniculatus
Mallotus peltatus
Mallotus philippensis
Mallotus pierrei
Mallotus repandus
Megistostigma burmanicum
Ostodes paniculata
Phyllanthus amarus
Phyllanthus columnaris
Phyllanthus emblica
Phyllanthus kerrii
Phyllanthus reticulatus
Phyllanthus roseus
Phyllanthus sootepensis
Phyllanthus urinaria
Phyllanthus virgatus
Sauropus amoebiflorus
Sauropus bicolor
Sauropus garrettii
Sauropus hirsutus
Sauropus orbicularis
Sauropus orbilaris
Sauropus quadrangularis
Sauropus similis
Securinega virosa
Suregada multiflora
Trewia nudiflora

Ulmaceae
Celtis tetrandra
Celtis timorensis
Holoptelea integrifolia
Trema orientalis
Ulmus lanceifolia

Moraceae

Artocarpus gomezianus
Artocarpus lakoocha
Artocarpus lanceolata
Broussonetia kurzii
Broussonetia papyrifera
Ficus abelii
Ficus altissima
Ficus auriculata
Ficus benjamina
Ficus callosa
Ficus capillipes
Ficus curtipes
Ficus cyrtophylla
Ficus fistulosa
Ficus geniculata
Ficus glaberrima
Ficus hederacea
Ficus heterophylla
Ficus heteropleura
Ficus hirta
Ficus hispida
Ficus laevis
Ficus lyrata
Ficus microcarpa
Ficus obtusifolia
Ficus parietalis
Ficus pisocarpa
Ficus pubigera
Ficus racemosa
Ficus rumphii
Ficus sagittata
Ficus sarmentosa
Ficus semicordata
Ficus squamosa
Ficus subulata
Ficus superba
Ficus variegata
Ficus virens
Ficus sp.
Maclura amboinensis
Maclura cochinchinensis
Maclura fruticosa
Morus macroura
Streblus asper
Streblus taxoides

Urticaceae

Boehmeria chiangmaiensis
Boehmeria clidemioides
Boehmeria diffusa
Boehmeria hamiltoniana
Boehmeria macrophylla
Boehmeria pilosiuscula
Boehmeria pseudotomentosa
Boehmeria thailandica
Boehmeria zollingeriana
Debregeasia longifolia
Debregeasia squamata
Dendrocnide sinuata
Distemon indicum
Elatostema integrifolium
Elatostema lineolatum
Elatostema longipes
Elatostema monandrum
Elatostema platyphyllum
Girardinia hibiscifolia
Laportea bulbifera
Laportea interrupta
Maoutia puya
Oreocnide rubescens
Pellionia latifolia
Pellionia repens
Pilea anisophylla
Pilea microphylla
Pilea trinervia
Pouzolzia hirta
Pouzolzia pentandra
Pouzolzia zeylanica

Juglandaceae
Engelhardia serrata
Engelhardia spicata

Betulaceae
Betula alnoides
Carpinus londoniana

Myricaceae
Myrica esculenta

Fagaceae

Castanopsis acuminatissima
Castanopsis argyrophylla
Castanopsis armata
Castanopsis diversifolia
Castanopsis indica
Castanopsis rockii
Castanopsis tribuloides
Lithocarpus aggregatus
Lithocarpus craibianus
Lithocarpus elegans
Lithocarpus fenestratus
Lithocarpus finetii
Lithocarpus garrettianus
Lithocarpus lindleyanus
Lithocarpus polystachyus
Lithocarpus sootepensis
Lithocarpus spicatus
Lithocarpus thomsonii
Lithocarpus truncatus
Quercus aliena
Quercus brandisiana
Quercus glabricupula
Quercus incana
Quercus kerrii
Quercus kingiana
Quercus lanata
Quercus lineata
Quercus mespilifolia
Quercus semiserrata
Quercus vestita

Salicaceae
Salix tetrasperma

Angiospermae, Monocotyledoneae

Butomaceae
Limnocharis flava

Alismataceae
Sagittaria trifolia

Triuridaceae
Sciaphila thaidanica

Commelinaceae

Amischotolype glabrata
Amischotolype mollissima
Aneilema discretum
Aneilema divergens
Aneilema herbaceum
Aneilema ovatum
Aneilema scaberrimum
Aneilema sinicum
Belosynapsis ciliata
Commelina benghalensis
Commelina diffusa
Commelina longifolia
Commelina paludosa
Cyanotis axillaris
Cyanotis cristata
Floscopa scandens
Murdannia loureiroi
Murdannia nudiflora
Murdannia scapiflora
Pollia hasskarlii

Xyridaceae
Xyris capensis
Xyris pauciflora

Eriocaulaceae
Eriocaulon oryzetorum
Eriocaulon truncatum
Eriocaulon aff. ubonense

Musaceae
Musa acuminata
Musa balbisiana
Musa itinerans
Musa sikkimensis

Zingiberaceae

Alpinia blepharocalyx
Alpinia galanga
Alpinia malaccensis
Amomum koenigii
Amomum ovoideum
Amomum repoeense
Amomum siamense
Amomum sp.
Boesenbergia longiflora
Boesenbergia longipes
Boesenbergia rotunda
Costus globosus
Costus speciosus
Curcuma aff. comosa
Curcuma ecomata
Curcuma longa
Curcuma parviflora
Curcuma zedoaria
Etlingera littoralis
Gagnepainia godefroyi
Globba clarkei
Globba kerrii
Globba nisbetiana
Globba nuda
Globba purpurascens
Globba reflexa
Globba schomburgkii
Globba villosula
Globba xantholeuca
Hedychium coccineum
Hedychium ellipticum
Hedychium gardnerianum
Hedychium villosum
Kaempferia elegans
Kaempferia roscoeana
Kaempferia rotunda
Kaempferia siamensis
Zingiber barbatum
Zingiber bradleyanum
Zingiber aff. integrum
Zingiber kerrii
Zingiber parishii
Zingiber rubens
Zingiber smilesianum
Zingiber sp.

Marantaceae
Donax canniformis
Halopegia brachystachys
Phrynium capitatum
Stachyphrynium spicatum

Liliaceae

Asparagus filicinus
Aspidistra longifolia
Aspidistra sutepensis
Chlorophytum intermedium
Dianella ensifolia
Disporopsis longifolia
Disporum calcaratum
Disporum cantoniense
Iphigenia indica
Lilium primulinum
Ophiopogon intermedius
Ophiopogon longifolius
Ophiopogon malcolmsonii
Ophiopogon regnieri
Ophiopogon reptans
Paris polyphylla
Peliosanthes teta
Polygonatum kingianum
Tupistra albiflora

Agavaceae
Dracaena angustifolia

Amaryllidaceae
Crinum wattii
Curculigo capitulata
Curculigo gracilis
Curculigo latifolia
Hypoxis aurea

Iridaceae
Iris collettii

Smilacaceae
Smilax corbularia
Smilax lanceifolia
Smilax megacarpa
Smilax ovalifolia
Smilax perfoliata
Smilax verticalis
Smilax zeylanica

Araceae

Acorus gramineus
Aglaonema simplex
Alocasia acuminata
Alocasia macrorrhizos
Alocasia navicularis
Amorphophallus corrugatus
Amorphophallus fuscus
Amorphophallus aff. koratensis
Amorphophallus krausei
Amorphophallus longituberosus
Amorphophallus macrorhizus
Amorphophallus paeoniifolius
Amorphophallus thaiensis
Amorphophallus yunnanensis
Arisaema album
Arisaema consanguineum
Arisaema cuspidatum
Arisaema erubescens
Arisaema kerrii
Arisaema maxwellii
Arisaema prazeri
Colocasia affinis
Colocasia antiquorum
Colocasia esculenta
Colocasia fallax
Colocasia gigantea
Epipremnum giganteum
Hapaline benthamiana
Homalomena aromatica
Homalomena occulta
Lasia spinosa
Lemna sp.
Pothos chinensis
Remusatia hookeriana
Remusatia pumila
Remusatia vivipara
Rhaphidophora chevalieri
Rhaphidophora glauca
Rhaphidophora hookeri
Rhaphidophora megaphylla
Rhaphidophora peepla
Sauromatum horsfieldii
Typhonium hirsutum
Typhonium horsfieldii
Typhonium trilobatum

Araceae species listed in Sungkajanttranon et al. (2019):

Stemonaceae
Stemona burkillii
Stemona kerrii
Stemona tuberosa

Dioscoreaceae

Dioscorea alata
Dioscorea arachidna
Dioscorea birmanica
Dioscorea bulbifera
Dioscorea decipiens
Dioscorea esculenta
Dioscorea glabra
Dioscorea hamiltonii
Dioscorea hispida
Dioscorea kamoonensis
Dioscorea kerrii
Dioscorea membranacea
Dioscorea pentaphylla
Dioscorea prazeri
Dioscorea pseudonitens
Dioscorea rockii

Palmae
Areca laosensis
Calamus arborescens
Calamus kerrianus
Livistona speciosa
Phoenix loureiri
Plectocomia kerriana
Wallichia caryotoides

Pandanaceae
Pandanus penetrans

Apostasiaceae
Apostasia wallichii

Taccaceae
Tacca chantrieri
Tacca integrifolia

Burmanniaceae
Burmannia coelestis
Burmannia wallichii

Orchidaceae

Acanthephippium striatum
Acriopsis indica
Aerides falcata
Anoectochilus brevistylus
Anoectochilus elwesii
Anoectochilus repens
Anoectochilus siamensis
Anoectochilus tortus
Anthogonium gracile
Aphyllorchis caudata
Aphyllorchis montana
Arundina graminifolia
Brachycorythis helferi
Brachycorythis henryi
Bromheadia aporoides
Bulbophyllum bittnerianum
Bulbophyllum congestum
Bulbophyllum morphologorum
Bulbophyllum nigrescens
Bulbophyllum propinquum
Bulbophyllum secundum
Bulbophyllum suavissimum
Calanthe cardioglossa
Calanthe clavata
Cheirostylis griffithii
Chiloschista parishii
Chrysoglossum ornatum
Cirrhopetalum retusiusculum
Cleisomeria lanatum
Cleisostoma arietinum
Cleisostoma filiforme
Cleisostoma fuerstenbergianum
Cleisostoma racemiferum
Cleisostoma rolfeanum
Coelogyne lentiginosa
Coelogyne schultesii
Coelogyne trinervis
Crepidium acuminatum
Crepidium biauritum
Crepidium calophyllum
Crepidium orbiculare
Cymbidium aloifolium
Cymbidium dayanum
Cymbidium ensifolium
Cymbidium lancifolium
Cymbidium siamense
Cymbidium tracyanum
Cyrtosia nana
Dendrobium aphyllum
Dendrobium cariniferum
Dendrobium christyanum
Dendrobium compactum
Dendrobium crystallinum
Dendrobium dixanthum
Dendrobium falconeri
Dendrobium fimbriatum
Dendrobium gratiosissimum
Dendrobium heterocarpum
Dendrobium lindleyi
Dendrobium moschatum
Dendrobium ochreatum
Dendrobium parcum
Dendrobium porphyrophyllum
Dendrobium primulinum
Dendrobium pulchellum
Dendrobium secundum
Dendrobium senile
Dendrobium signatum
Dendrobium stuposum
Dendrobium sutepense
Dendrobium venustum
Dendrobium wilmsianum
Dendrobium sp.
Didymoplexiella siamensis
Diploprora championii
Disperis siamensis
Drymoda siamensis
Epipogium roseum
Eria acervata
Eria affinis
Eria bipunctata
Eria pannea
Eria perpusilla
Eria siamensis
Eria sutepensis
Eulophia geniculata
Eulophia nuda
Eulophia pauciflora
Eulophia siamensis
Galeola integra
Gastrodia exilis
Geodorum attenuatum
Geodorum citrinum
Geodorum siamense
Goodyera fumata
Goodyera procera
Goodyera thailandica
Goodyera viridiflora
Habenaria amplexicaulis
Habenaria dentata
Habenaria furcifera
Habenaria holotricha
Habenaria hosseusii
Habenaria humistrata
Habenaria limprichtii
Habenaria lucida
Habenaria malintana
Habenaria medioflexa
Habenaria rostellifera
Habenaria stenopetala
Habenaria viridiflora
Liparis downii
Liparis paradoxa
Liparis regnieri
Liparis siamensis
Liparis sutepensis
Liparis viridiflora
Liparis wrayi
Luisia thailandica
Monomeria barbata
Nervilia aragoana
Nervilia calcicola
Nervilia crociformis
Nervilia plicata
Oberonia acaulis
Oberonia pachyphylla
Ornithochilus difformis
Otochilus albus
Pachystoma pubescens
Pecteilis susannae
Peristylus constrictus
Peristylus goodyeroides
Peristylus gracilis
Peristylus lacertifer
Peristylus tentaculatus
Phaius tankervilleae
Phalaenopsis cornu-cervi
Pholidota articulata
Pholidota bracteata
Pholidota convallariae
Pholidota imbricata
Polystachya concreta
Rhynchogyna saccata
Rhynchostylis coelestis
Spathoglottis pubescens
Staurochilus loratus
Stereosandra javanica
Sunipia racemosa
Taeniophyllum glandulosum
Tainia angustifolia
Tainia hookeriana
Tainia speciosa
Tainia viridifusca
Trichotosia dasyphylla
Tropidia angulosa
Tropidia curculigoides
Tropidia pedunculata
Vanda brunnea
Vanilla siamensis
Zeuxine affinis

Cyperaceae

Bulbostylis barbata
Bulbostylis densa
Carex commixta
Carex baccans
Carex condensata
Carex continua
Carex cruciata
Carex doisutepensis
Carex filicina
Carex horsfieldii
Carex indica
Carex perakensis
Carex phacota
Carex speciosa
Carex tricephala
Cyperus brevifolius
Cyperus compactus
Cyperus compressus
Cyperus corymbosus
Cyperus cuspidatus
Cyperus cyperinus
Cyperus cyperoides
Cyperus difformis
Cyperus distans
Cyperus elatus
Cyperus exaltatus
Cyperus flavidus
Cyperus haspan
Cyperus imbricatus
Cyperus involucratus
Cyperus iria
Cyperus kyllingia
Cyperus laxus
Cyperus leucocephalus
Cyperus michelianus
Cyperus niveus
Cyperus nutans
Cyperus pilosus
Cyperus polystachyos
Cyperus pumilus
Cyperus rotundus
Cyperus sesquiflorus
Cyperus sulcinux
Cyperus tenuiculmis
Cyperus unioloides
Eleocharis congesta
Fimbristylis adenolepis
Fimbristylis aestivalis
Fimbristylis cinnamometorum
Fimbristylis dichotoma
Fimbristylis eragrostis
Fimbristylis fimbristyloides
Fimbristylis hookeriana
Fimbristylis intonsa
Fimbristylis merrillii
Fimbristylis miliacea
Fimbristylis nutans
Fimbristylis ovata
Fimbristylis schoenoides
Fimbristylis straminea
Fimbristylis tetragona
Fimbristylis thomsonii
Fimbristylis yunnanensis
Fuirena ciliaris
Fuirena umbellata
Lipocarpha chinensis
Lipocarpha hemisphaerica
Lipocarpha pygmaea
Rhynchospora rubra
Rhynchospora rugosa
Scirpus grossus
Scirpus juncoides
Scirpus mucronatus
Scirpus siamensis
Scirpus squarrosus
Scirpus subcapitatus
Scirpus ternatus
Scleria benthamii
Scleria ciliaris
Scleria kerrii
Scleria levis
Scleria lithosperma
Scleria mikawana
Scleria pergracilis
Scleria psilorrhiza
Scleria reticulata
Scleria scrobiculata
Scleria terrestris

Poaceae

Acroceras tonkinense
Alloteropsis cimicina
Alloteropsis semialata
Andropogon chinensis
Apluda mutica
Apocopis courtallumensis
Aristida chinensis
Aristida cumingiana
Arthraxon castratus
Arthraxon lancifolius
Arundinella bengalensis
Arundinella nepalensis
Arundinella setosa
Bothriochloa bladhii
Brachiaria ramosa
Capillipedium assimile
Capillipedium parviflorum
Cenchrus brownii
Centotheca lappacea
Chloris barbata
Chloris virgata
Chrysopogon aciculatus
Chrysopogon zizanioides
Coix lacryma-jobi
Cynodon dactylon
Cyrtococcum accrescens
Cyrtococcum oxyphyllum
Dactyloctenium aegyptium
Dichanthium caricosum
Diectomis fastigiata
Digitaria fibrosa
Digitaria fuscescens
Digitaria longiflora
Digitaria setigera
Digitaria siamensis
Digitaria ternata
Digitaria violascens
Echinochloa colona
Echinochloa crusgalli
Eleusine indica
Elytrophorus spicatus
Enteropogon dolichostachyus
Eragrostis amabilis
Eragrostis montana
Eragrostis nigra
Eragrostis pilosa
Eragrostis poaeoides
Eragrostis unioloides
Eulalia leschenaultiana
Eulalia pallens
Eulalia quadrinervis
Eulalia siamensis
Eulalia speciosa
Eulaliopsis binata
Garnotia acutigluma
Garnotia patula
Hemarthria compressa
Heteropogon contortus
Heteropogon triticeus
Hyparrhenia rufa
Imperata cylindrica
Ischaemum rugosum
Leersia hexandra
Leptochloa chinensis
Microstegium vagans
Mnesithea granularis
Mnesithea mollicoma
Mnesithea striata
Rottboellia cochinchinensis
Oplismenus burmannii
Oplismenus compositus
Oryza meyeriana
Ottochloa nodosa
Panicum humile
Panicum maximum
Panicum miliaceum
Panicum notatum
Panicum repens
Paspalum conjugatum
Paspalum orbiculare
Paspalum scrobiculatum
Pennisetum pedicellatum
Pennisetum polystachion
Pennisetum purpureum
Perotis indica
Phragmites vallatoria
Poa annua
Pogonatherum paniceum
Polytoca digitata
Polytrias indica
Pseudechinolaena polystachya
Pseudopogonatherum contortum
Pseudopogonatherum irritans
Rhynchelytrum repens
Saccharum arundinaceum
Saccharum fallax
Sacciolepis indica
Schizachyrium brevifolium
Schizachyrium sanguineum
Sehima nervosum
Setaria flavida
Setaria palmifolia
Setaria parviflora
Setaria sphacelata
Setaria verticillata
Sorghum nitidum
Sporobolus diandrus
Sporobolus indicus
Sporobolus tetragonus
Themeda arguens
Themeda arundinacea
Themeda triandra
Thysanolaena latifolia
Tripogon trifidus
Urochloa distachya
Urochloa panicoides

Bambusoideae

Ampelocalamus patellaris
Bambusa bambos
Bambusa burmanica
Bambusa griffithiana
Bambusa membranacea
Bambusa pallida
Bambusa tulda
Bambusa vulgaris
Cephalostachyum pergracile
Dendrocalamus giganteus
Dendrocalamus nudus
Dinochloa macclellandii
Gigantochloa albociliata
Gigantochloa apus
Teinostachyum dullooa
Thyrsostachys oliveri

Gymnospermae

Cycadaceae
Epicycas tonkinensis

Podocarpaceae
Podocarpus neriifolius

Pinaceae
Pinus kesiya
Pinus merkusii

Cephalotaxaceae
Cephalotaxus griffithii

Cupressaceae
Cupressus torulosa

Gnetaceae
Gnetum leptostachyum
Gnetum montanum

Pteridophyta

Psilotaceae
Psilotum nudum

Lycopodiaceae
Lycopodium cernuum
Lycopodium squarrosum

Selaginellaceae
Selaginella argentea
Selaginella delicatula
Selaginella helferi
Selaginella involvens
Selaginella kurzii
Selaginella minutifolia
Selaginella ostenfeldii
Selaginella pennata
Selaginella repanda
Selaginella roxburghii

Equisetaceae
Equisetum debile

Ophioglossaceae
Ophioglossum petiolatum

Marattiaceae
Angiopteris evecta

Gleicheniaceae
Dicranopteris linearis
Dicranopteris splendida

Schizaeaceae
Lygodium flexuosum
Lygodium giganteum
Lygodium japonicum
Lygodium polystachyum

Hymenophyllaceae
Crepidomanes latealatum
Hymenophyllum exsertum

Cyatheaceae
Cyathea chinensis
Cyathea gigantea
Cyathea podophylla

Dennstaedtiaceae
Hypolepis punctata
Microlepia platyphylla
Microlepia puberula
Microlepia speluncae
Microlepia strigosa
Pteridium aquilinum

Lindsaeaceae
Lindsaea chienii
Lindsaea ensifolia
Sphenomeris chinensis

Davalliaceae
Araiostegia pulchra
Davallia trichomanoides
Davallodes membranulosum
Gymnogrammitis dareiformis
Leucostegia immersa
Pachypleuria repens

Oleandraceae
Nephrolepis biserrata
Nephrolepis cordifolia
Nephrolepis delicatula
Oleandra undulata

Parkeriaceae
Adiantum edgeworthii
Adiantum erylliae
Adiantum philippense
Adiantum zollingeri
Ceratopteris thalictroides
Cheilanthes belangeri
Cheilanthes pseudofarinosa
Cheilanthes tenuifolia
Coniogramme fraxinea
Hemionitis arifolia
Pityrogramma calomelanos

Vittariaceae
Antrophyum callifolium
Antrophyum parvulum
Antrophyum winitii
Vittaria flexuosa
Vittaria sikkimensis

Pteridaceae

Pteris asperula
Pteris biaurita
Pteris cretica
Pteris decrescens
Pteris ensiformis
Pteris heteromorpha
Pteris longipes
Pteris venusta
Pteris vittata
Pteris wallichiana

Aspleniaceae

Asplenium apogamum
Asplenium bilabiatum
Asplenium cheilosorum
Asplenium crinicaule
Asplenium ensiforme
Asplenium excisum
Asplenium macrophyllum
Asplenium nidus
Asplenium obscurum
Asplenium rockii
Asplenium yoshinagae

Blechnaceae
Blechnum orientale
Brainea insignis

Lomariopsidaceae

Bolbitis appendiculata
Bolbitis heteroclita
Bolbitis hookeriana
Bolbitis scalpturata
Bolbitis sinensis
Bolbitis virens
Elaphoglossum marginatum
Elaphoglossum yoshinagae

Dryopteridaceae

Arachniodes henryi
Diacalpe aspidioides
Didymochlaena truncatula
Dryopteris cochleata
Dryopteris hirtipes
Dryopteris integriloba
Dryopteris neoassamensis
Dryopteris pseudosparsa
Pleocnemia irregularis
Polystichum attenuatum
Polystichum biaristatum
Polystichum eximium
Tectaria christii
Tectaria fauriei
Tectaria fuscipes
Tectaria herpetocaulos
Tectaria impressa

Thelypteridaceae

Thelypteris arida
Thelypteris ciliata
Thelypteris confluens
Thelypteris crinipes
Thelypteris cylindrothrix
Thelypteris dentata
Thelypteris hirtisora
Thelypteris hispidula
Thelypteris interrupta
Thelypteris lakhimpurensis
Thelypteris nudata
Thelypteris papilio
Thelypteris parasitica
Thelypteris repens
Thelypteris subelata
Thelypteris terminans
Thelypteris truncata
Thelypteris xylodes

Athyriaceae

Anisocampium cumingianum
Athyrium anisopterum
Athyrium dissitifolium
Cornopteris opaca
Diplazium asperum
Diplazium donianum
Diplazium esculentum
Diplazium leptophyllum
Diplazium polypodioides
Diplazium siamense
Kuniwatsukia cuspidata

Polypodiaceae

Aglaomorpha coronans
Arthromeris amplexifolia
Belvisia henryi
Crypsinus cruciformis
Crypsinus griffithianus
Crypsinus oxylobus
Crypsinus rhynchophyllus
Drynaria bonii
Drynaria fortunei
Drynaria propinqua
Drynaria rigidula
Lepisorus bicolor
Lepisorus heterolepis
Lepisorus nudus
Lepisorus scolopendrium
Lepisorus subconfluens
Leptochilus decurrens
Leptochilus ellipticus
Loxogramme chinensis
Microsorum membranaceum
Platycerium wallichii
Polypodium amoenum
Polypodium argutum
Polypodium manmeiense
Polypodium subauriculatum
Pyrrosia adnascens
Pyrrosia eberhardtii
Pyrrosia lanceolata
Pyrrosia mollis
Pyrrosia porosa
Pyrrosia stigmosa

Marsileaceae
Marsilea crenata

Salviniaceae
Salvinia cucullata

Azollaceae
Azolla pinnata

See also
List of trees of northern Thailand, based on Gardner, Sidisunthorn & Anusarnsunthorn (2007)
List of Thai provincial trees

References

Doi Suthep–Pui National Park

Plants of Doi Suthep-Pui National Park